Oxychilus agostinhoi is a species of small air-breathing land snail, a terrestrial pulmonate gastropod mollusk in the family Oxychilidae, the glass snails. This species is endemic to Azores islands (Portugal).

References

Oxychilus
Molluscs of the Azores
Gastropods described in 1981
Taxonomy articles created by Polbot